The Flemish institute for technological research ( or VITO), is an independent Flemish research organisation that provides scientific advice and technological innovations that facilitate the transition to a sustainable society, and this in the areas of energy, chemistry, materials, health and land use.

Organisation
VITO is a public limited company incorporated under the decree of 23 January 1991. This decree was replaced by the decree of 30 April 2009. VITO is part of the policy domain of the Department of Economy, science & Innovation (EWI) of the Flemish government.

VITO works partly with its own resources (contract research, patents), partly with grants from the Flemish government, so that government commissioners from the Department of Economy, science and Innovation (EWI) are also part of the Board of Directors.

Civil Engineer Dirk Fransaer has been Managing Director of VITO since 2001. Also part of the Board of Directors: Director Research & Development: Walter Eevers, Director Human Resources & General Services: Agnes Bosmans, Director Finance: Rob Fabry, and Commercial Director: Bruno Reyntjens.

The head office of VITO is located in Mol (Belgium). VITO also has offices in Berchem, Genk, Ostend, Ghent and Kortrijk. The international offices are located in Qatar, Beijing and Dubai.

VITO is active in 40 countries and has around 850 employees with 43 different nationalities.

Objectives 

 Accelerate the transition to a competitive, clean and secure energy system in Flanders and the world
 Introduce short material cycles to set up ecosystems throughout the world for circular economy
 Radically reduce the consumption of fossil-based feedstocks and energy within the Flemish chemical sector
 Facilitate innovative, preventive and affordable healthcare, underpinned by measuring instruments and data
 Stimulate sustainable use of space and water, with links to health, agriculture and more

Collaborations 
VITO cooperates with companies, either directly or in partnership with industry networks such as the spearhead clusters and business organisation. In Flanders and by extension internationally.

VITO also works closely with European scientific communities and international institutions.

 EnergyVille
 Cleantech Flanders
 Vlakwa

Revenue 
In 2017, VITO had a revenue of 172 million euros.

See also
 BIOMED
 Flanders Interuniversity Institute of Biotechnology (VIB)
 Flemish Energy Agency
 Fonds Wetenschappelijk Onderzoek (FWO)
 Innotek
 Institute for the promotion of Innovation by Science and Technology (IWT)
 Interdisciplinary institute for BroadBand Technology (IBBT)
 Interuniversity Microelectronics Centre (IMEC)
 Science and technology in Flanders
 SCK•CEN
SIRRIS
 Strategic Plan Campine

Sources

External links
 VITO
 EMIS
VITO on Research Gate

Research institutes in Belgium
Scientific organisations based in Belgium
Flemish government departments and agencies
Mol, Belgium